Best of Enemies may refer to:

Films
 Best of Enemies (1933 film), an American comedy film
 Best of Enemies (2015 film), an American documentary film
 Best of Enemies, alternate title of The Girls' Room, a 2000 American comedy-drama film
 The Best of Enemies (1915 film), a comedy film
 The Best of Enemies (1961 film), a British-Italian comedy film
 The Best of Enemies (2019 film), an American drama film

Other
 Best of Enemies (novel), a 1991 Nancy Drew & Hardy Boys mystery novel
 Best of Enemies (play), a 2021 play by James Graham
 Best of Enemies (TV series), a 1968 British comedy series
 Best of Enemies: A History of US and Middle East Relations, a 2012 graphic novel drawn by David Beauchard
 The Best of Enemies: Race and Redemption in the New South, a 1996 non-fiction book by Osha Gray Davidson

See also
 Best of Friends (disambiguation)